Dubai is one of the world's leading tourism destinations, and tourism in Dubai is a major source of revenue. The city hosted 14.9 million overnight visitors in 2016. In 2018, Dubai was the fourth most-visited city in the world based on the number of international visitors.

History

The discovery of oil in 1966 kick-started the development of present Dubai, however Sheikh Rashid bin Saeed Al Maktoum (ruler from 1958 till 1990) realised one day Dubai would run out of oil and started building an economy that would outlast it. A quote commonly attributed to Sheikh Rashid reflected his concern that Dubai's oil, which was discovered in 1966 and which began production in 1969, would run out within a few generations. Sheikh Rashid stated "My grandfather rode a camel, my father rode a camel, I drive a Mercedes, my son drives a Land Rover, his son will drive a Land Rover, but his son will ride a camel". Sheikh Rashid realized early he needed to diversify the emirate of Dubai's economy by building on the city's trading history and therefore he set out to establish Dubai as the region's trade and service hub. By 1979, he was successful in establishing the Jebel Ali Port, which became the logical shipping centre for the entire United Arab Emirates and the world's largest man-made port. He also upgraded Dubai International Airport and built the Dubai World Trade Centre, which was then the tallest building in the Middle East. By the end of the 1970's, the stage was set for the diversification of Dubai's economy away from oil and into other areas such as tourism.

In 1989 the Dubai Commerce and Tourism Promotion Board was established, to promote Dubai as a luxury destination for the up-tier market and influential business sectors. In January 1997, it was replaced with the Department of Tourism and Commerce Marketing (DTCM).

In May 2013, the government of Dubai launched the Dubai Tourism Strategy 2020, with the key objective to attract 20 million visitors a year by 2020 and making Dubai a first choice destination for international leisure travellers as well as business travellers. In 2018, the strategy was expanded by setting new goals of attracting 21-23 million visitors in 2022 and 23-25 million visitors by 2025. The key objectives from 2013 and 2018 were not met due to the COVID-19 pandemic. 

The need to maintain its tourism industry has hampered Dubai’s response to the COVID-19 pandemic. Along with COVID-19 Dubai’s tourism sector has also been hurt by a greater international awareness of the status of human rights in the emirate and in particular the treatment of Princess Latifa bint Mohammed Al Maktoum.

In November 2022, Sheikh Mohammed bin Rashid announced a national tourism strategy until 2031. The goal of the strategy is to attract Dh 100 billion in additional tourism investments (so that the tourism sector’s contribution will be Dh450bn of DUbai's GDP in 2031) and receive 40 million hotel guests in 2031. The strategy includes 25 initiatives and policies to support the development of the tourism sector in the country.

Visitors and visitor spending

Since 1982, Dubai continued to be one of the fastest growing destinations for tourists. In 2002, visitors were mainly from other Gulf Cooperation Council members which accounted for 34% of tourists, South Asia accounted for 25%, other Arab states 16%, Europe 15%, and Africa 9%. In 2003, revenue from tourism exceeded $1 billion and surpassed oil revenues to directly and indirectly account for over 17% and 28% of GDP respectively.

From January to June 2019 8.36 million international tourists visited Dubai. Most of the visitors were from India (997.000) followed by Saudi Arabia (755.000) and the United Kingdom (586,000).

Mastercard's Global Destination Cities Index 2019 found that tourists spend more in Dubai than in any other country. In 2018, the country topped the list for the fourth year in a row with a total spend of $30.82 billion, a 3.8% increase over 2017 ($29.70 billion). The average spend per day was $553. 

In 2019, Dubai attracted a total of 16.73 million tourists, which was an increase of 5.09% on the previous year. However, in 2020, the number of visitors dropped to 5.51 million due to the coronavirus pandemic.

Accommodation

In the last three years, Dubai saw an increase in 4 and 5 star hotels and number of rooms, but a decrease in standard hotel apartments. The total number of rooms increased by 9,098 from 2015 to 2017, an increase of 9.25%. Prior to the Expo 2020 hotels in Dubai were reducing room rates to stimulate demand as supply accelerated. Based on data of August 2019, Dubai hoteliers reported a 7.6% rise in supply against 7.4% increase in demand. Average room rates stood at AED 486 in June 2019 while in the same month of 2018 average room rates were at 544 AED. In July 2019, Dubai's Jumeirah Group LLC fired 500 people due to a decline in tourism. In the second quarter of 2019, hospitality sector has had the worst quarter since 2009.

Attractions

Aspects of Dubai's old culture, while occasionally overshadowed by the boom in economic development, can be found by visiting places around the creek, which splits Dubai into two halves, Bur Dubai and Deira. The buildings lining the Bur Dubai side of the Creek provide the main flavor of the old city. Heritage Village is one of the few remaining parts of historical Dubai, containing preserved buildings. The adjoining Diving Village offers exhibits on pearl diving and fishing. The Diving Village forms part of an ambitious plan to turn the entire "Shindagha" area into a cultural city, recreating life in Dubai as it was in days gone by.

Other attractions include the Sheikh Saeed Al Maktoum House; the Dubai Museum in the restored Al Fahidi Fort, which was erected around 1799; and the Heritage Village of Hatta, situated 115 kilometers southeast of Dubai City in the heart of the rocky Hatta Mountains. The history of the village can be traced back 2000 – 3000 years. It consists of 30 buildings, each differing in size, interior layout and building materials used. Great care was taken to use the same materials as those used when originally built during the renovation such as mud, hay, sandalwood and palm fronds. The Sharia Mosque is an old mosque built in the early 19th century using the same building materials and consists of a large prayer hall, a court and courtyard, minaret and other utility rooms. Other museums include the Al Ahmadiya School.

Shopping

Dubai has been nicknamed the "shopping capital of the Middle East." The city draws large numbers of shopping tourists from countries within the region and from as far as Eastern Europe, Africa and the Indian Subcontinent. Dubai is known for its souk districts. Souk is the Arabic word for market or place where any kind of goods are brought or exchanged. Traditionally, dhows from the Far East, China, Sri Lanka, and India would discharge their cargo and the goods would be bargained over in the souks adjacent to the docks.

Modern shopping malls and boutiques are also found in the city. Dubai Duty Free at Dubai International Airport offers merchandise catering to the multinational passengers using Dubai International Airport. Outside of Duty Free areas and major sales, Dubai has a reputation for being one of the most expensive shopping destinations in the world.

While boutiques, some electronics shops, department stores and supermarkets may operate on a fixed-price basis, most other outlets consider friendly negotiation as a way of life.

Dubai's numerous shopping centres cater for every consumer's need. Cars, clothing, jewellery, electronics, furnishing, sporting equipment and any other goods will all be likely to be under the same roof.

The Dubai Shopping Festival is a month-long festival held during the month of January each year. During the festival the entire emirate becomes one massive shopping mall. Additionally, the festival brings together music shows, art exhibitions, and folk dances.

The Dubai Summer Surprises (DSS) is the summer version of Dubai Shopping Festival held during June, July and August. Dubai Government launched Dubai Summer Surprises in 1998 in order to promote Dubai as a family holiday destination. DSS offers fun, entertainment, food deals and great offers on shopping.

Cultural sensitivity

Tourists are required to obey some Muslim religious restrictions in public even if they are not Muslim themselves, such as refraining from eating or drinking in public places in the daytime during Ramadan.

Dubai has a modest dress code as part of its criminal law. Sleeveless tops and short dresses are not encouraged at Dubai Mall. Clothes are advised to be in appropriate lengths.

Homosexuality is criminalized in Dubai, including for tourists. However, there is a vibrant underground gay scene in Dubai and authorities do not actively search for homosexuals to enforce the law.

Transportation

Most capitals and other major cities have direct flights to Dubai. More than 120 airlines operate to and from Dubai International Airport to more than 260 destinations. Dubai International Airport is the world's busiest airport by international passenger traffic. Dubai is also the home base of Emirates Airline, which operates scheduled services to more than 100 destinations.

In June 2009 Emirates airline designated a special handling area at departures and arrivals for passengers with special needs, allowing wheelchair passengers to receive a more personalized service.

The establishment of the first cruise terminal in Dubai in 2001 and the opening of the enhanced New Dubai Cruise Terminal in February 2010 with higher handling capacity has drawn the attention of cruise line operators. Cruises to Dubai sail from: Singapore, Sydney, Athens, Dover, Venice, Cape Town, Civitavecchia, Piraeus, Alexandria, Istanbul, New York City, Southampton, Barcelona, Fort Lauderdale, Miami, Los Angeles, Mumbai, Hong Kong, Shanghai, Monte Carlo, Mombasa, Victoria, and Cairns among others.

The United Arab Emirates has a network of roads that connect major towns and villages, including a multi-lane highway between Dubai and Abu Dhabi, with access to and from the bordering countries of Saudi Arabia and Oman. Highways and main roads in Dubai and the United Arab Emirates are designated by an Emirate Route Number. Speed limits are displayed on road signs and are usually  around town and  elsewhere.

Dubai ranked third in the best taxi services behind Tokyo and Singapore.

Illicit drugs
Travelers entering Dubai are warned for harsh penalities regarding illicit drug use or smuggling. Authorities in Dubai use highly sensitive equipment to conduct thorough searches to find trace amount of illegal substances. A senior Dubai judge was quoted on February 11, 2008, by the Dubai City News saying, "These laws help discourage anyone from carrying or using drugs. Even if the quantity of illegal drugs found on someone is 0.05 grams, they will be found guilty. The penalty is a minimum of four years. The message is clear — drugs will not be tolerated."

Health

No special immunizations are required, but tourists are encouraged to purchase appropriate medical insurance before travelling. Government immunization programs have led to recognition by a travel magazine. As a latest addition to the established modern health care system, Dubai offers online health care contacts of virtually all medical doctors in Dubai.

Sports tourism

Dubai hosts the following international championships:

 Dubai World Cup – the richest horse race in the world
 Dubai Classic - the golf championship
 Barclays Dubai Tennis for both men and women
 UIM World Powerboat racing
 Rugby Sevens
 Dubai International Rally
 Dubai Snooker Classic
 The UAE Desert Challenge
 The Standard Chartered Dubai Marathon

See also

 Developments in Dubai
 List of development projects in Dubai
 List of tourist attractions in the United Arab Emirates
 Palm Islands

Notes

References

External links
Visit Dubai Official Instagram